Ampollino Lake is a lake in the Province of Catanzaro, Province of Cosenza and Province of Crotone of Calabria, Italy. The reservoir was built in 1926.

Lakes of Calabria